Milla Saari (née Jauho; born 10 July 1975) is a Finnish former cross-country skier who competed from 1994 to 2007. She was best known for her doping role in the 2001 FIS Nordic World Ski Championships doping scandal that would affect five other Finnish skiers for taking hydroxyethyl starch (HES), a blood plasma expander.  Saari, then Jauho, was part of the 4 × 5 km relay team that finished second, but would be disqualified for her blood doping and would receive a two-year suspension from the FIS as a result. She also finished sixth in the 15 km event at those same championships.

Saari competed at the 1998 Winter Olympics in Nagano where she finished 31st in the 15 km event and 50th in the 30 km event. She earned all four of her individual career victories up to 10 km after she served her two-year doping suspension from 2003 to 2005.

Saari retired after the 2006–07 World Cup season.

Cross-country skiing results
All results are sourced from the International Ski Federation (FIS).

Olympic Games

World Championships

a.  Cancelled due to extremely cold weather.

World Cup

Season standings

Team podiums
1 victory – (1 ) 
2 podiums – (2 )

See also
List of sportspeople sanctioned for doping offences

References

External links
 

1975 births
Living people
Finnish female cross-country skiers
Finnish sportspeople in doping cases
Doping cases in cross-country skiing
Cross-country skiers at the 1998 Winter Olympics
Olympic cross-country skiers of Finland
People from Nivala
Sportspeople from North Ostrobothnia